Acacia uncinella is a shrub of the genus Acacia and the subgenus Plurinerves that is endemic to an area of south western Australia.

Description
Like most species of Acacia it has phyllodes rather than true leaves. It blooms from August to October and produces yellow flowers. The simple inflorescences occur in pairs in the axils and have spherical flower-heads with a diameter of  containing 16 to 30 golden coloured flowers. Glabrous and thinly crustaceous seed pods form after flowering that have a linear shape but are slightly raised over and constricted between each of the seeds.

Distribution
It is native to an area in the Wheatbelt  and Goldfields-Esperance regions of Western Australia where it is commonly situated around salt flats and lakes, on slopes or sandplains growing in rocky loamy or sandy soils. Other outlying populations are found around Merredin, Kellerberrin and Boorabbin National Park as well as to the south of Zanthus where it is often a part of Banksia and Casuarina scrubland and Eucalyptus scrub-woodland communities.

See also
 List of Acacia species

References

uncinella
Acacias of Western Australia
Taxa named by George Bentham
Plants described in 1855